The 1921 Hammond Pros season was their second in the league. The team failed to improve on their previous output of 2–5, winning only one game. They tied for thirteenth place in the league.

Schedule

Games in italics are against non-NFL teams.

Standings

References

Hammond Pros seasons
Hammond Pros
Hammond Pros